Chukkallo Chandrudu ( Moon among the stars) is a 2006 Indian Telugu-language romance film directed by Sivakumar. It is produced by Alexander Vallabha on Creative Commercials. The film stars Akkineni Nageswara Rao, Siddharth, Sadha, Charmme Kaur and Saloni Aswani. The music is composed by Chakri. Siddharth also worked as a writer for the film. Many scenes of this movie were shot in exotic locations around Innsbruck city.

Plot 
Arjun is an NRI who lives with his grandfather Krishna Rao and grandmother Padmavathi. Padmavathi wants Arjun to get married. She also tells her husband but does not take it seriously. Suddenly one morning, Padmavathi dies in her sleep. Krishna Rao feels bad that he couldn't fulfill his wife's last wish: to get Arjun married. So he tries to convince Arjun for marriage but he refuses so, Krishna Rao leaves for India, where there are some people who will listen to him and give him respect. Arjun finds out that he is in India and flies from Germany to India to bring back him. Krishna Rao only agrees to come only if Arjun would marry. Arjun, along with the help of his childhood friend Puppy, close in on three girls: Shalini, Sravani, and Sandhya. Shalini is a tennis player, Sravani is a student who is pursuing MBBS, and Sandhya is women's activist. Incidentally, all three girls happen to be his childhood friends. Arjun introduced himself as Krishna, not like a childhood friend. He started impressing them with his funny and joyful attempts and he succeeds to impress three of them and three became very close to him. He was confused to decide whom should he propose in three of them. Arjun decides to randomly draw one of the three names and whoever gets picked, Arjun would try to love that girl.

First is Sandhya. Arjun tries to tell Sandhya that he loves her through illogical ways. Because Sandhya is very ignorant, Arjun calls her a tomboy and Sandhya slaps him. Now he randomly draws another name and this time, it is Shalini. But he gets a phone call from Shalini that she is at the airport. Arjun quickly rushes to see Shalini and she says that she has a tournament in Switzerland and also has a boyfriend. Arjun gets disappointed big time and gets a call from Sravani, saying that she is at the hospital. Arjun again rushes and goes to the hospital and finds out that Sravani's grandmother's situation is not looking good. There is a big crowd around the table and Sravani is afraid to talk up, as she fears that no one will listen to her. Arjun gives her courage and Sravani is able to speak for herself. He also pays for Sravani's grandmother's operation behind Sravani's back. By the time, Arjun reaches his place, he gets a call from Shalini, saying that she was just messing with Arjun (April Fools). She asks him to come to Switzerland and Arjun goes to Switzerland.

Shalini throws the tournament so that she can romance with Arjun. But one night, Shalini's father gets drunk and upset because his daughter lost the competition. Arjun gets upset too because he was selfishly thinking about himself only. The next day, Arjun leaves for India, saying to Shalini that she should pursue her career and to remain an inspiration to others. Arjun gives away his identity and shocks Shalini. Shalini also wishes the best for Arjun in his life. After coming back to India, Arjun learns that Sravani is getting engaged to an NRI in the United States. Sravani thinks that her fiancé is paying for her grandmother's operation when Arjun was paying for it the whole time. Now, Arjun lost all three of his choices. He goes back to his grandfather and asks him to go back with him to Germany. Arjun's grandfather gives him another idea: to choose proposals from a list he already selected. Arjun doesn't like any of the proposals. There he meets Sandhya and Sandhya finds out that he was her childhood friend. Sandhya proposes Arjun and he says that yes, he will marry her. At a party, Arjun meets Sharat, Sandhya's ex. Arjun finds out that Sharat still has feelings for Sandhya. Arjun manages to link up  Sandhya with Sharat and both happily go their own way.

Again, Arjun lost all his choices. Arjun goes to Sravani's wedding to wish Sravani and her fiancé all the best. But he overhears the groom talking about leaving Sravani after the wedding. Arjun punches him in the face and a huge fight happens. Arjun's grandfather also goes to the marriage and Sravani instantly recognizes who he is (she still does not know that Arjun is getting beaten up). She hears Arjun calling from downstairs and looks to see him beaten. Arjun confesses that he is her childhood friend. She does not believe at first but after asking his grandfather, she runs downstairs to embrace Arjun. The elders also believe that the marriage between Sravani and her fiancé should end as he is a cheat. The film ends with Arjun marrying Sravani, settling in Germany.

Cast 

 Akkineni Nageswara Rao as Krishna Rao
 Siddharth as Arjun / Krishna
 Sadha as Sravani
 Charmy as Sandhya
 Saloni as Shalini
 Sunil as Puppy
 Prathap K. Pothan as Prakash
 Tanikella Bharani
 Ahuti Prasad as Laksham Rao
 Kondavalasa
 K. R. Vijaya
 Sana
 Mounika
 Waheeda Rehman as Padmavathi (special appearance)
 Prabhu Deva as Sharath (guest appearance)

Soundtrack

Music composed by Chakri.

Release 
A critic from The Hindu gave a positive review and noted that "Siddharth excels in all the departments and shows good comedy timing. Saloni, Charmme and Sada do justice to their roles. After a long time, Akkineni [Nageswara Rao] comes to the big screen and even matches the dancing steps along with the hero. Music by Chakri is enthralling while choreography is good". Jeevi of Idlebrain gave the film rating of 3.25 out of 5 and wrote that "Producer Alexander Vallabha should be appreciated for making his debut with a film that defies the routine formula. On a whole, Chukkallo Chandrudu is a sophisticated comedy film for multiplex crowds". Full Hyderabad gave a positive review and opined that "This is an enjoyable movie that provides a good time for the family. Middle-aged cynics will need an extra dose of patience, but who knows, it may even touch their romantic buttons".

References

External links
 

2006 films
2000s Telugu-language films
Indian romantic comedy films
Telugu films remade in other languages
Films scored by Chakri
2006 directorial debut films
2006 romantic comedy films